Revenger is a 2018 South Korean action film directed by Lee Seung-won, starring Bruce Khan, Park Hee-soon, Yoon Jin-seo and Kim In-kwon. It was released on December 6, 2018.

Premise
Set in the near future, dangerous criminals are housed in a hellish prison island. A man purposely sends himself to the island to avenge the murder of his family.

Cast

Bruce Khan as Yool
Park Hee-soon as Carlos Kun
Yoon Jin-seo as Mali
Kim In-kwon as Bau
Park Chul-min
Kim Na-yeon
 Jeon Soo-Jin as Khun's henchwoman

Production
Principal photography began on October 9, 2017, and wrapped on April 27, 2018, with portions filmed in Indonesia.

References

External links
 
 
 

2018 films
2018 action films
South Korean action films
South Korean prison films
2010s prison films
Films shot in Indonesia
2010s South Korean films